Zuzana Snow (born in Nitra, Slovakia, 3 May 1994) is a Slovakian model.

Early life
Raised in Nitra, Snow is the youngest daughter of her family, with two sisters. She was discovered by her first agent at the age of fifteen but decided to finish her schooling before becoming a full-time model. After graduating, she focused on her career and moved to Paris.

Career
Snow has walked the runways for Armani, Balmain, Dior, Chanel, Hugo Boss, Jean Paul Gaultier, Christian Lacroix, Van Cleef & Arpels, Chopard, Louis Vuitton, Gucci, Issey Miyake, and Trussardi.

Snow has appeared in editorials and advertisements in Vogue, Harper's Bazaar, Elle, Marie Claire, Amica, Soon, Black magazine, and Cosmopolitan.  She was also featured on the covers of Harper's Bazaar, Zoot, Tribute, Univers Cannes, Vizon, and Femme.

In 2008, she played the main character in Trembling Waters' music video "Steps in the Dark."

Agencies
 Major – Paris,
 Major – Milan,
 New York Model Management - NY,
 Model Management – Hamburg,
 Sky Management - Tokyo,
 Next Company – Vienna,
 Group Models – Spain,
 Chic Management – Sydney,
 Elite Model Management - Amsterdam,
 Option – Switzerland,
 Elite – Stockholm

References

External links
 Snow Official Website
 Snow at Fashion Model Directory
 Press review, Cover Zuzana Snow
 Snow at Douglas Hannant
 Snow at Zang Toi
 Video clip Steps in the Dark, featuring Snow

Living people
Slovak female models
People from Nitra
1994 births